The House at 53 Linden Street in Brookline, Massachusetts, is a well-preserved local example of transitional Greek Revival-Italianate styling. The -story wood-frame house was built c. 1843–44 by John Faxon. It has a pedimented gable front with pilasters, but is L-shaped and has round-arch windows in its gables, both Italianate features. It is one of four surviving Greek Revival houses in the neighborhood, which was developed beginning in 1840.

The house was listed on the National Register of Historic Places in 1985.

See also
 National Register of Historic Places listings in Brookline, Massachusetts

References

Houses in Brookline, Massachusetts
Italianate architecture in Massachusetts
Houses completed in 1843
National Register of Historic Places in Brookline, Massachusetts
1843 establishments in Massachusetts
Houses on the National Register of Historic Places in Norfolk County, Massachusetts